The 2017 Liga 2 Final decided the winner of the 2017 Liga 2, the second-tier competition in Indonesia. It was played on 28 November 2017 at the Gelora Bandung Lautan Api Stadium in Bandung between PSMS Medan and Persebaya Surabaya.

Persebaya won the match 3–2 on extra time after a 2–2 draw at regular time, winning their 4th title overall.

Road to the final

Match

References

2017 in Indonesian football
2017